is a major junction station owned and operated by the private Kintetsu railway company in the city of  Matsusaka, Mie Prefecture. The station is served by all trains on that company's Yamada Line and most trains on its Nagoya and Osaka Lines. The Ise-Nakagawa stationmaster is responsible for managing the sections between here and Higashi-Aoyama on the Osaka Line and between here and Higashi-Matsusaka on the Yamada Line.

Lines
Kintetsu Railway
Nagoya Line (to Kintetsu-Nagoya)
Osaka Line (to Ōsaka-Uehommachi)
Yamada Line (to Ujiyamada)

Station layout
The station consists of six parallel tracks numbered 1 through 6 (see diagram below). Four island platforms are located to serve Tracks 1 & 2, 2 & 3, 3 & 4, and 4 & 5. Track 6 is served by one side platform. This layout allows trains on Tracks 2, 3, and 4 to open their doors on both sides, enabling easy transfer between trains on the three major lines which connect at this station.

Limited express trains running directly between the Nagoya Line and the Osaka Line do not pass through Ise-Nakagawa station. Instead, these trains use a north-east to north-west chord which connects the two lines at a point some 3.5 km north-west of the station, the two trunk lines and this chord together constituting a triangular junction.

Adjacent stations

History
It received its present name on 15 March 1941 when this company merged with the Osaka Electric Railway to form the Kansai Express Railway and Ise-Nakagawa become a station on the merged company's Yamada Line. A further merger,  with the Nankai Electric Railway on 1 June 1, 1944, created the Kinki Nippon Railway, forerunner of today's Kintetsu Railway Co. Ltd. A new station building was completed in 2004.

Passenger statistics
In fiscal 2019, the station was used by an average of 4369 passengers daily (boarding passengers only).

Surrounding area
 Ureshino Furusato Center
 Matsusaka City Ureshino Junior High School
 Matsusaka City Nakagawa Elementary School
Matsusaka City Nakahara Elementary School
Matsusaka City Toyoda Elementary School
Matsusaka Municipal Toyoji Elementary School

See also
List of railway stations in Japan

References

External links

Kintetsu: Ise-Nakagawa Station 
 Kintetsu: Ise-Nakagawa Station layout

Railway stations in Mie Prefecture
Railway stations in Japan opened in 1930
Stations of Kintetsu Railway
Matsusaka, Mie